"Ti Th' Akouso Akoma" (Greek: "Τι θ'ακούσω ακόμα") is a song by popular Greek artist Peggy Zina. It was released on July 4, 2000 by Nitro Music and is included on her album Ena Hadi. The song was written by Kyriakos Papadopoulos and Ilias Fillipou and was released as a four track CD single.

Track listing
"Ti Th' Akouso Akoma" - 3:21
"Mia Fora Sto Toso" - 3:05
"Afta Pou Ikseres Palia" - 3:42
"Oneira Mou Taksidiarikia" - 3:18

References

2000 singles
Greek-language songs
Peggy Zina songs
2000 songs